The 2018 European Athletics Championships were held in Berlin, Germany, from 6 to 12 August 2018. The championships were part of the first European Championships with other events happening in the United Kingdom.

For the second Championships in a row the Russian team did not participate; this was due to the suspension of the All-Russia Athletic Federation by the International Association of Athletics Federations. However, several athletes were cleared by the IAAF to compete as Authorised Neutral Athletes under the flag of the European Athletic Association. Mariya Lasitskene became the first such athlete to win a gold medal, in the women's high jump.

Event schedule

Results

Men

Track

* Indicates the athlete only competed in the preliminary heats and received medals.

Field

Women

Track

* Indicates the athlete only competed in the preliminary heats and received medals.

Field

Medal table

Notes
 The European Athletic Association (commonly known as "European Athletics") does not include the medals won by Authorised Neutral Athletes in the medal table.

* Updated after the disqualifications of Alina Tsviliy and Meraf Bahta.

Entry standards
Entry standards and conditions were published on 8 December 2017.

Participating nations
Athletes from a total of 49 member federations of the European Athletics Association competed at these Championships. On top of this a total of 29 athletes competed as Authorised Neutral Athletes. One athlete (Puok Thiep Gatkuoth in men's marathon) was announced to compete as part of Athlete Refugee Team, but in the end he did not start.

See also

2018 World Para Athletics European Championships, the European championship event for disabled athletes, also held in Berlin in 2018.

References

External links

Home page
European Championships page
EAA Official website
EAA Timetable & Results
PDF Results

 
European Championships
2018 in Berlin
2018 in European sport
2018 in German sport
August 2018 sports events in Germany
2018
European Championships, 2018
Sports competitions in Berlin
Athletics in Berlin
2018 European Championships